Bogoljub Šijaković (born 1955 in Nikšić) is a Serbian scholar, Professor of Philosophy at the Faculty of Orthodox Theology, University of Belgrade (Serbia) and Professor of Greek Philosophy at the Faculty of Philosophy in Nikšić (Montenegro). He served as Minister of Religious Affairs in the Federal Government of Yugoslavia (2000–2002) and in the Government of the Republic of Serbia (2008–2011).

Education
Bogoljub Šijaković studied philosophy at the  University of Belgrade, Faculty of Philosophy, graduating in 1981 and obtaining a magister degree in 1986. In 1989, he received his PhD in early Greek philosophy from the University of Sarajevo. His research stays abroad include the University of Munich (1988/1989, with Professor Werner Beierwaltes) and the University of Athens (recurring short-term visits during 1993-1996, with Professor Konstantine Boudouris).

Selected works
 Mythos, physis, psyche: An Essay in Presocratic “Ontology” and “Psychology” (in Serbian 1991, 22002; Summary in German)
 Zoon politikon: Examples from Personal Legitimacy (in Serbian 1994)
 Amicus Hermes: Aufsätze zur Hermeneutik der griechischen Philosophie (collection of essays in various languages 1996; in Serbian 1994 as Hermes’ Wings)
 History, Responsibility, Holiness (in Serbian 1997)
 Bibliographia Praesocratica: A Bibliographical Guide to the Studies of Early Greek Philosophy in its Religious and Scientific Contexts with an Introductory Bibliography on the Historiography of Philosophy (Paris 2001)
 Between God and Man: Essays in Greek and Christian Thought (Sankt Augustin 2002)
 Face to Face with the Other: A Fugue in Essays (in Serbian 2002)
 A Critique of Balkanistic Discourse: Contribution to the Phenomenology of Balkan “Otherness” (Toronto 2004; in Serbian 2000, 52012; in Italian 2001; in Slovenian 2001; in German 2004; in French 2010; in Russian 2015)
 Mirroring in Context: On Knowledge and Belief, Tradition and Identity, Church and State (in Serbian 2009, 22011)
 Myth and Philosophy: The Ontological Potentiality of Myth and the Beginning of Greek Philosophy. Theories of Myth and Greek Mythmaking: A Bibliography (in Serbian 2012; Summaries in English and German)
 On Suffering and Memory: Selected “Anthropological” Essays (in Serbian 2012)
 History : Violence : Theory: Selected “Historiosophical” Essays (in Serbian 2012)
 The Presence of Transcendence: Essays on Facing the Other through Holiness, History and Text (Los Angeles 2013; in Serbian 2013)
 University and Serbian Theology (Belgrade 2014; in Serbian 2010, 22014)
 Great War, Ethics of Vidovdan, Memory (in Serbian 2015)
 Resistance to Oblivion (in Serbian 2016)

He has published over 330 articles, studies, bibliographies and reviews in periodicals and collections of papers in Serbian, German, English, French, Russian, Italian, Slovenian and Bulgarian.  To date, he has edited over 40 thematic publications. He was editor-in-chief of the Journal for Philosophy and Sociology Luča (1992–2006) and founding editor of the International Journal for Philosophy and Theology Philotheos (since 2001), as well as of periodicals Bibliographia serbica theologica (since 2009) and Bibliographia serbica philosophica (since 2011). He is managing the project Serbian Theology in the Twentieth Century and editing the accompanying collection of papers (20 vols., 2007–2015).  His many translations in Serbian encompass German, English, Russian and Greek texts (e.g. F. D. E. Schleiermacher, M. Heidegger, H.-G. Gadamer, E. Fink, H. Blumenberg, E. Fromm, W. D. Ross, G. Florovsky).

References

External links
University of Belgrade - Faculty of Orthodox Theology, Staff (in Serbian)
Philotheos: International Journal for Philosophy and Theology

1955 births
Serbs of Montenegro
Living people
Writers from Nikšić
University of Belgrade Faculty of Philosophy alumni
20th-century Serbian philosophers
21st-century Serbian philosophers
Academic staff of the University of Belgrade
Eastern Orthodox theologians
Historians of philosophy
Government ministers of Serbia
Serbia and Montenegro politicians